Cody Andrew Anderson (born September 14, 1990) is an American former professional baseball pitcher who played in Major League Baseball (MLB) for the Cleveland Indians.

Early life
Anderson was born September 14, 1990, in Quincy, California. Anderson attended Quincy Junior-Senior High School. Anderson attended Feather River College, where he was an outfielder and relief pitcher.

Career

Minor league career
Anderson was drafted by the Tampa Bay Rays in the 17th round of the 2010 Major League Baseball Draft, but did not sign and returned to college. He was then drafted by the Cleveland Indians in the 14th round of the 2011 Major League Baseball Draft and signed. The Indians then converted him into a starting pitcher. He made his professional debut with the Mahoning Valley Scrappers that season.

Anderson pitched the 2012 season for the Lake County Captains. He finished the season 4–7 with a 3.20 earned run average with 72 strikeouts in  innings pitched over 24 games. Anderson started the 2013 season with the Carolina Mudcats and ended the season with the Akron Aeros. He finished the year with a 2.65 earned run average with 122 strikeouts over 136 innings in 26 starts. For his play he won the Bob Feller Award as the Indians best minor league pitcher, and was the Carolina League's Pitcher of the Year.

Major league career
After the 2014 season, the Indians added Anderson to their 40-man roster. On June 21, 2015, Anderson made his MLB debut against the Tampa Bay Rays going  innings with 4 strikeouts and 1 BB.
On June 29, 2015, Anderson made his second career start against the Tampa Bay Rays. He had a perfect game going through  innings, until former Indian Grady Sizemore hit a home run. Anderson and the Indians won the game 7–1, while Anderson went 8 innings pitched, 1 earned run, striking out two, and two hits. On July 9, 2015, Anderson went  innings, giving up a home run to Houston Astros' Hank Conger to start the 3rd inning with one strike out, winning his second career game. In 15 starts for Cleveland, he went 7–3 with a 3.05 earned run average in  innings. 

The 2016 season proved to be a difficult one for Anderson as he struggled to a 6.68 earned run average in 19 games, 9 of them starts. In  innings, he struck out 54 but also allowed 13 home runs.

Anderson injured the ulnar collateral ligament of his pitching elbow during the Indians' 2017 spring training camp. The Indians subsequently announced that Anderson required "Tommy John" surgery and would miss the entire 2017 season. He also missed the entire 2018 season recovering.

Following the 2019 season, Anderson was outrighted off the Indians roster and became a free agent.

Seattle Mariners
On February 17, 2020, Anderson signed a minor league deal with the Seattle Mariners. Anderson was released by the Mariners in March before the beginning of the season.

References

External links

1990 births
Living people
People from Quincy, California
Baseball players from California
Major League Baseball pitchers
Cleveland Indians players
Feather River Golden Eagles baseball players
Mahoning Valley Scrappers players
Lake County Captains players
Carolina Mudcats players
Akron Aeros players
Akron RubberDucks players
Columbus Clippers players
Arizona League Indians players